Madhatter, slang name for Java Desktop System
 6735 Madhatter, a minor planet

See also 

 Mad Hatter (disambiguation)